Abd al-Aziz of Mogadishu was a 14th-century island chief or katheeb of Kinolhas  island of the Maldives. When Ibn Battuta visited the Maldives islands, the governor of the island of Utheemu at that time was Abd Aziz-al Makdashawi.

Descent or Ancestry

Purnima Mehta Bhatt a professor of history, anthropology, and interdisciplinary studies at Hood College, USA, wrote: the term makdashawi originates from Mogadishu in Somalia''

chief of the island, Abd al - Aziz al - Makdashawi ( i.e. of Mogadishu ), suggests a clear connection with the Somali capital" 

His name indicates a connection with the Somali coast although not necessarily of African ethnic origin,

Biography
Abd al-Aziz was a Somali governor of the island of Utheemu of Maldives. After him is named the Abdul-Aziz Mosque in Mogadishu which has remained there for centuries.

In 1346, Abd al-Aziz welcomed Ibn Battuta at his court and entertained him before giving him a barque to continue his journey.

See also
Ibn Battuta
Culture of Somalia
Demographics of Somalia

References

External links
Maldivian Links with Eastern Africa

Ethnic Somali people
Somali sultans
History of the Maldives
Mogadishu
14th-century Somalian people